Sakurada Sadakuni is referred to in the Taiheiki as grand marshal in command of the Shogunate forces during the Kōzuke-Musashi Campaign.

References
 McCullough, Helen Craig (1959). "The Taiheiki. A Chronicle of Medieval Japan." 2003. Charles E. Tuttle Company, Tokyo, .
 Papinot, E. (1910). "Historical and Geographical Dictionary of Japan." 1972 Printing. Charles E. Tuttle Company, Tokyo, .

Notes

Samurai
People of Kamakura-period Japan